The twelfth electoral unit of the Federation of Bosnia and Herzegovina is a parliamentary constituency used to elect members to the House of Representatives of the Federation of Bosnia and Herzegovina since 2000.  It consists of Canton 10.

Demographics

Representatives

References

Constituencies of Bosnia and Herzegovina